Achillea ptarmica is a European species of herbaceous perennial flowering plant in the genus Achillea of the daisy family Asteraceae. Common names include the sneezewort, sneezeweed, bastard pellitory, European pellitory, fair-maid-of-France, goose tongue, sneezewort yarrow, wild pellitory, and white tansy. It is widespread across most of Europe and naturalized in scattered places in North America. It is native to Europe and western Asia.

Achillea ptarmica has loose clusters of showy white composite flower heads that bloom from June to August. Its dark green leaves have finely toothed margins. Like many other plants, the sneezewort's pattern of development displays the Fibonacci sequence.

The name ptarmica comes from the Greek word ptairo (=sneeze) and means 'causes sneezing'.

Uses
Leaves can be eaten raw or cooked. Achillea ptarmica yields an essential oil that is used in herbal medicine. The leaves are used as an insect repellent.

When chewed, the plant produces a numbing, tingling effect in the mouth, comparable to that of Sichuan pepper. For this reason, it is sometimes used in herbal medicine to relieve toothache or ulcers, and as a culinary herb.

Cultivation
This is a hardy, drought-tolerant plant that prefers full sun and moist but well-drained soil. Propagation is by sowing seed or division in Spring. It will tolerate hot, humid summers, and drought.

References

ptarmica
Flora of Europe
Garden plants of Europe
Medicinal plants of Europe
Plants described in 1753
Taxa named by Carl Linnaeus